The UCI Track Cycling World Championships – Women's elimination is the women's world championship elimination race event held annually at the UCI Track Cycling World Championships. The event was first introduced in 2021.

Medalists

Medal table

External links
Track Cycling World Championships 2016–1893 bikecult.com
World Championship, Track, Scratch, Elite cyclingarchives.com

 
Women's elimination
Lists of UCI Track Cycling World Championships medalists